Faslname-ye Ketab is the quarterly journal of the National Library and Archives of the Islamic Republic of Iran.

 the editors requested that submissions be sent in Zarnegar or Microsoft Word format in order to "accelerate the
process of publication".

References

External links
 

Magazines published in Tehran
Quarterly journals
Persian-language journals
Library science journals
Archival science journals